Fagraea auriculata is a species of bush or semi-liana  in the family Gentianaceae.   It can be found in Indo-China and Malesia (where it may be called bira-bira); in Viet Nam it is called trai tai.

Subspecies 
The Catalogue of Life lists:
 F. auriculata auriculata
 F. auriculata parviflora

References

External links 

Fagraea
Flora of Indo-China 
Flora of Malesia